Podgorica pri Šmarju is a small settlement just north of Šmarje–Sap in the Municipality of Grosuplje in central Slovenia. The area is part of the historical region of Lower Carniola and is now included in the Central Slovenia Statistical Region.

Name
The name Podgorica is a fused prepositional phrase that has lost its case inflection (from pod 'below' + gorica 'small mountain'), literally meaning 'below the small mountain'. Place names like Podgorica (e.g., Podgorje, Podgora) are relatively common in Slovenia. The name of the settlement was changed from Podgorica to Podgorica pri Šmarju in 1955.

References

External links

Podgorica pri Šmarju on Geopedia

Populated places in the Municipality of Grosuplje